Old Stone Tavern, also known as The Nowell House, The Bell House, and The Old Stone House, is a historic home located at Little Creek, Kent County, Delaware.  The main section was built about 1829, and is a two-story, five-bay, stone Georgian-style structure.  It has a gable roof with brick cornice and dormers.  A -story brick kitchen wing is attached.  It was thought to have been a tavern by the local community, but records have shown that it was always a dwelling house.

It was listed on the National Register of Historic Places in 1973.

References

Houses on the National Register of Historic Places in Delaware
Georgian architecture in Delaware
Houses completed in 1829
Houses in Kent County, Delaware
National Register of Historic Places in Kent County, Delaware